Bad Lauchstädt was a Verwaltungsgemeinschaft ("collective municipality") in the Saalekreis district, in Saxony-Anhalt, Germany. The seat of the Verwaltungsgemeinschaft was in Bad Lauchstädt. It was disbanded on 1 January 2010.

The Verwaltungsgemeinschaft Bad Lauchstädt consisted of the following municipalities:
 Bad Lauchstädt
 Milzau

References

Former Verwaltungsgemeinschaften in Saxony-Anhalt